The 2019 Warwick District Council election took place on 2 May 2019 to elect members of Warwick District Council in England. This was on the same day as other local elections. The whole council was up for election on new boundaries. The Conservative Party lost control of the council.

Summary

Election result

|-

Ward results

Bishop's Tachbrook

Budbrooke

Cubbington and Leek Wootton

Kenilworth Abbey and Arden

Kenilworth Park Hill

Kenilworth St John's

Leamington Brunswick

Leamington Clarendon

Leamington Lillington

Leamington Milverton

Leamington Willes

Radford Semele

Warwick All Saints and Woodloes

Warwick Aylesford

Warwick Myton and Heathcote

Warwick Saltisford

Whitnash

By-elections

Leamington Lillington

Warwick Myton & Heathcote

Leamington Clarendon (May 2021)

Whitnash

Leamington Clarendon (June 2022)

References 

Warwick District Council elections
2019 English local elections
May 2019 events in the United Kingdom
2010s in Warwickshire